The 2012 United States House of Representatives elections in Kentucky were held on Tuesday, November 6, 2012 to elect the six U.S. representatives from the state of Kentucky, one from each of the state's six congressional districts. The elections will coincide with the elections of other federal and state offices, including a quadrennial presidential election. Primary elections were held on May 22, 2012.

Overview

Redistricting
Redistricting legislation was passed by both houses of the Kentucky General Assembly and signed into law by Governor Steve Beshear on February 10, 2012.

District 1

Republican Ed Whitfield, who has represented the 1st district since 1995, ran for re-election. In redistricting, the 1st district was made slightly more competitive, but continues to strongly favor Republicans.

Republican primary

Candidates

Nominee
Ed Whitfield, incumbent U.S. Representative

Democratic primary

Candidates

Nominee
Charles Kendall Hatchett, nominee for this seat in 2010

Eliminated in primary
James Buckmaster

Declined
Brent Yonts, state representative

Primary results

General election

Results

District 2

Republican Brett Guthrie, who has represented the 2nd district since 2009, ran for re-election. In redistricting, the 2nd district was made slightly more favorable to Republicans.

Democratic primary

Candidates

Nominee
David Lynn Williams, perennial candidate

Declined
Elaine Walker, former Secretary of State of Kentucky

Libertarian primary
Craig Astor ran as a Libertarian:

General election

Results

District 3

Democrat John Yarmuth, who has represented the 3rd district since 2007, ran for re-election. The 3rd district was made more favorable to Democrats in redistricting.

Democratic primary

Candidates

Nominee
John Yarmuth, incumbent U.S. Representative

Eliminated in primary
Burrel Charles Farnsley, perennial candidate

Primary results

Republican primary

Candidates

Nominee
Brooks Wicker, financial advisor and candidate for this seat in 2010

General election

Results

District 4

Republican Geoff Davis, who had represented 4th district from 2005 to 2012, resigned due to family health issues. In redistricting, the 4th district was made more favorable to Republicans.

Republican primary

Candidates

Nominee
 Thomas Massie, Lewis County judge-executive

Eliminated in primary
 Walter Christian Schumm, building contractor
 Marcus Carey, lawyer
 Gary Moore, Boone County judge-executive
 Brian Oerther, teacher
 Alecia Webb-Edgington, state representative 
 Tom Wurtz, business consultant

Declined
Hunter Bates, former chief of staff to Senator Mitch McConnell
Kenny Brown, Boone County Clerk
Ben Dusing, lawyer and former assistant U.S. Attorney
Trey Grayson, former Secretary of State of Kentucky;
Adam Koenig, state representative
K. Lance Lucas, lawyer and son of former Democratic U.S. Representative Ken Lucas
Rick Robinson, aide to former Senator Jim Bunning
Kevin Sell, businessman
Katie Stine, President Pro Tempore of the Kentucky Senate
Damon Thayer, state senator

Primary results

Democratic primary

Candidates

Nominee
 Bill Adkins, lawyer and chair of the Grant County Democratic Party

Eliminated in primary
 Greg Frank, military veteran

Declined
Kenny French, former Gallatin County Judge-Executive
Patrick Hughes, attorney
Linda Klembara, president of the Kentucky Women's Network
Darrell Link, Grant County Judge-Executive
Ken Rechtin, Campbell County Commissioner 
Nathan Smith, vice chairman of the Kentucky Democratic Party
Diane Whalen, Mayor of Florence

Primary results

General election

Results

District 5

Republican Hal Rogers, who has represented the 5th district since 1981, ran for re-election. The 5th district was made slightly more competitive in redistricting.

Republican primary

Candidates

Nominee
Hal Rogers, incumbent U.S. Representative

Democratic primary

Candidates

Nominee
Kenneth Stepp, lawyer

Eliminated in primary
Michael Ackerman

Primary results

General election

Results

District 6

Democrat Ben Chandler, who has represented the 6th district since 2004, ran for re-election. In redistricting, the 6th district was modified with the effect that, had the 2008 presidential election been held under the new boundaries, Democratic nominee Barack Obama would have received a share of the vote 1.5 percentage points greater than that which he achieved under the former boundaries.

Democratic primary

Candidates

Nominee
Ben Chandler, incumbent U.S. Representative

Republican primary

Candidates

Nominee
Andy Barr, attorney and nominee for this seat in 2010

Eliminated in primary
Patrick J. Kelly II
Curtis Kenimer

Primary results

General election
Randolph S. Vance ran as a write-in candidate.

Endorsements

Polling

Predictions

Results

References

External links
Elections from the Kentucky Secretary of State
United States House of Representatives elections in Kentucky, 2012 at Ballotpedia
Kentucky U.S. House at OurCampaigns.com
Campaign contributions for U.S. Congressional races in Kentucky at OpenSecrets
Outside spending at the Sunlight Foundation
House and Senate Campaign Finance at the Federal Election Commission - House and Senate Campaigns

Kentucky
2012
United States House of Representatives